Whoops Baghdad is a BBC television comedy programme first broadcast from 25 January to 1 March 1973.

It stars Frankie Howerd, and was similar to his earlier programme Up Pompeii!, with the setting moved from Ancient Rome to mediaeval Baghdad. However, it was less successful than its predecessor, only running for six episodes and is little remembered, although all episodes apparently survive.
The original proposed title, Up Baghdad, was rejected because it was felt that it might have been seen as supportive of the then-current Iraqi regime.

Cast
 Frankie Howerd as Ali Oopla, servant to the Wazir (6 episodes)
 Derek Francis as Abu ben Ackers, Wazir and Prime Minister of Old Baghdad (6 episodes)
 Hilary Pritchard as Saccharine, the Wazir's youngest and most innocent daughter (6 episodes)
 Anna Brett as Boobiana, the Wazir's oldest and most well developed daughter (5 episodes)
 Larry Martyn as Derti Dhoti the beggar (5 episodes)
 Alan Curtis as Captain of the Guard/Havabanana/Sheikh Akabar the Vile/Robber (5 episodes)
 Norman Chappell as Imshi the eunuch, caretaker of the Caliph's harem (2 episodes)
 Lee Young as Genie of the bottle (2 episodes)
 Bill Fraser as Wizard Prang/Caliph of Old Baghdad (2 episodes)
 Ronnie Brody as Mustafa Shufti, Wizard Prang's assistant (1 episode)
 Josephine Tewson as Fatima the Marriage Broker (1 episode)
 Patrick Troughton as Tambalane the Tartar (1 episode)
 Jane Murdoch as Tangerine (1 episode)
 Winifred Sabine as Tambalane's first wife (1 episode)
 Milton Reid as the harem's hairdresser (1 episode)
 June Whitfield as Charisma (1 episode)
 George Ballantine as Sinbad the Sailor (1 episode)
 Valerie Stanton as Shannonar (1 episode)

Episode list

References

External links
 
 

1970s British comedy television series
1973 British television series debuts
1973 British television series endings
Baghdad in fiction
BBC Television shows
BBC television sitcoms
Television series set in the Middle Ages